Compagnie des bauxites de Guinée (CBG) is a Guinean mining company. Since 1963 it has extracted bauxite from the notable mine in Sangarédi, in Boké Region in Guinea. It is 49% owned by the Guinean State, with the remainder owned by the Boké Investment Company, a 100%-owned subsidiary of Halco Mining, a consortium opened in 1962 by Harvey Aluminum Company to run mining operations in Guinea. Halco's stock is owned by Alcoa (45%), Rio Tinto Alcan (45%) and Dadco Investments (10%).

Guinea is the world's 5th largest producer of bauxite, yet the country holds the world's largest reserves of the valuable ore used to produce aluminum. Estimates of the country's reserves rise as high as 25 billion tons, or the majority of the world's bauxite.

Bauxite mining in Guinea

Guinea possesses a third of the best bauxite reserves in the world, or about 20 billion tons, with a high content (45-62 %) of alumina and a low silica content (0.8-2 %). Despite being ranked second after Australia in terms of production, it was, in 1993, the largest exporter in the world, having benefited from the relocation in the world aluminum industry in the 1970s; After global production tripled between 1950 and 1960, it doubled again in the 70s, which saw a strong consolidation around six companies: (Alcan, Alcoa, Reynolds, Kaiser, Pechiney Ugine Kuhlman and Alusuisse) as well as a strong vertical integration, as a result of which, in 1979 the members of the International Association of Bauxite Producing Countries supplied 75% of the world's bauxite, while only providing 4.5% of the world's Aluminum. High-Value added segments in the global aluminum value-chain (E.g. Alumina refining and smelting) have remained mostly in developed countries, meaning that despite Guinea's large ore deposits, most of the money made from that ore goes to the wealthy nations where industrial plants are located.

History

Early on, the country attracted prospectors.

On July 24, 1948, 20 mining exploration permits were awarded to the company. They discovered that the bauxite deposits of guinea consisted of  surface deposits which are entirely exploitable using mining pits and heavy vehicles.
In 1948 and 1950 the Guinean bauxite from the Îles de Los was shipped in small quantities to the Aluminum plants of Alcan in Saguenay-Lac-Saint-Jean in Québec, but in November 1966, that deposit was depleted, as was expected, despite nationalization.

Under the leadership of Pierre Jochyms, the planning of the utilization of significant deposits of bauxite (in Kassa, Boké and Fria), Iron ore (on the Kaloum peninsula and the Nimba-Simandou island chain) gold and diamonds was begun. The exceptional hydroelectric potential of the Konkouré watershed had already been identified, and two large dams were being researched (Grandes Chutes and Souapiti)

CBG began its first excavations in January, 1955, then suspended them for one year. Pechiney Ugine began its major project in 1957, on the site of Fria. Studies were done on the hydroelectric project in Konkouré, to the east of Fria, but following a referendum on September 28, 1958, they were kept secret by the colonial authorities.

In November, 1961, the government took possession of the sites of Kassa and Boké due to the failure of Bauxites du Midi (a wholly owned subsidiary of Alcan) to respect its agreement to refine its bauxite into aluminum locally after 1964. In 1962, Guinea joined the World Bank and CBG resumed its excavations on October 1, 1963, under the banner of the Compagnie des bauxites de Guinée, of which 49% ownership was held by the state of Guinea, and 51% by Harvey Aluminium of Delaware.

Bauxite exports began in 1973. The first ship loaded with Guinean bauxite left the port of Kamsar on August 2, 1973, with 19,000 tons of ore on board. In the 1970s, Africa's portion of global bauxite production tripled.

In 1965, the Boké Improvement Office (OFAB) was created to construct and manage CBG's infrastructures.

In 1967, the participation of Harvey Aluminum of Delaware was divided amongst several players in the mining sector: Alcan took 33%, Alcoa 27%, Martin Marietta 14%, Péchiney 10%, and Edison-Montecani 6%. At the end of the 70's, Fria exported more than 600,000 tons of alumina annually, of which a part went to the Pechiney's facilities at Edea in Cameroon, with two large foreign investors: Noranda (Canada) 38.5% and Pechiney Ugine Kuhlman (France) 36.5%.

Simultaneously, the site of Débélé in the region of the Kindia mine was made operational before 1974 after an agreement in November 1969, by a joint project of the Soviet Union and the Guinean government, which established the price of ore and announced that the Guinean state is fully the proprietor of said capital, the Soviet Union having assured the purchase of 90% of the ore. Exports passed from 2 million tons in 1974, to more than 3 million in 1988.

At the Boké site, the quantity of exports shifted from around 5 million tons in 1975 to 11 million in 1990.

In November, 2012, CBG signed a historic agreement with the Mubadala Investment Company to supply the United Arab Emirates with bauxite 

In December, 2013, Namory Conde, then regional director of BHP Billiton, was named director-general of CBG

Activity

The ore, reputed to be of excellent quality due to its 60% alumina content, is transported by rail to the port of Kamsar. The ground of Guinea contains 300 million tons of bauxite, which is enough to ensure production for at least 25 years.

If CBG is vital for the regional and national economy of the nation, it is also accused of being responsible for numerous instances of pollution - toxic dusts and the dumping of fuel oils into the sea - and this, despite an investment of 17 million to reduce dust emissions by 80% in 2005.

CBG exploits the mines of Sangarédi, of Bidikoum, of Silidara, and those of N’Dangara. The bauxite is intended for exportation, principally to North America, Europe and China.

Project of Expansion

In 2014, CBG undertook a project of expansion. This project would increase the capacity of the company's mining-production, of their rail transport, of their refinery, of their ports, of their electric generating stations and would generate new jobs and increase state-revenue

References

Aluminium companies of Guinea
Mining companies of Guinea